Hızır Sarı (born 19 February 1951) is a Turkish former wrestler who competed in the 1972 Summer Olympics.

References

External links
 

1951 births
Living people
Olympic wrestlers of Turkey
Wrestlers at the 1972 Summer Olympics
Turkish male sport wrestlers
World Wrestling Championships medalists